The NOAA Ship Nancy Foster (R 352) is a National Oceanic and Atmospheric Administration research vessel. The ship is named for Dr. Nancy Foster, who was the director of the National Marine Fisheries Service’s Office of Protected Resources from 1986 until 1993, and the director of the National Ocean Service from 1997 until her death in 2000.

Construction and commissioning
The ship originally was built as the United States Navy Cape Flattery-class torpedo trials craft Agate Pass (YTT 12) at McDermott Shipyards in Amelia, Louisiana, and launched in September 1990. In 2001, the Navy transferred the vessel to NOAA, which outfitted her to conduct coastal research along the United States East Coast and United States Gulf Coast and in the Caribbean. NOAA commissioned her as NOAAS Nancy Foster(R 352) on 10 May 2004.

Technical characteristics
The hull of Nancy Foster is 186 feet (56.7 m) long with a beam of 40 ft (12.1 m) and a draft of 12 ft 10 in (3.9 m). The ship has a total of 39 bunk spaces. She carries a complement of 6 NOAA Corps officers, 15 crew including 3 licensed engineers, and up to 17 visiting scientists. In 2018, the ship began a series of mid-life upgrades to extend her service life by another 30 years. Upgrades include installing new, more power diesel generators & main propulsion engine, renewing major equipment and performing extensive preservation.

The deck equipment features two winches and two deck cranes, along with an aft A-Frame and a port side A-Frame. This equipment gives the crew of the Nancy Foster the ability to do a variety of over-the-side oceanographic operations including launching and tending Remotely Operated Vehicles (ROV) and conductivity, temperature and depth (CTD) operations.  She also has hull mounted transducers that support multi-beam surveys, Acoustic Doppler Current Profiling (ADCP) and shallow water surveying.

Service history
Nancy Foster supports applied research for the NOAA National Ocean Service's Office of Ocean and Coastal Resource Management and the National Marine Sanctuary Program, and the NOAA Oceanic and Atmospheric Research's Office of Ocean Exploration, Atlantic Oceanographic and Meteorological Laboratory, the National Undersea Research Program, and the National Sea Grant College Program. Operations include the characterization of various habitats in NOAA's National Marine Sanctuaries, pollution assessments, and studies to improve understanding of the connection between marine habitats and estuaries. The ship supports scientific data collection through bottom fish trawling, sediment sampling, side-scan sonar and multi-beam surveying, sub-bottom profiling, core sampling, scientific diving with air and Nitrox, ROV operations, and servicing oceanographic/atmospheric surface and subsurface buoys. The vessel employs state of the art navigation and propulsion systems resulting in high quality and efficient data collection.

See also
NOAA ships and aircraft

External links

Footnotes

Ships of the National Oceanic and Atmospheric Administration
Ships transferred from the United States Navy to the National Oceanic and Atmospheric Administration
Ships built in Louisiana
1991 ships